Robsart can refer to:

Places
Robsart, Saskatchewan, a village in the Canadian province of Saskatchewan, named after Amy Robsart
Robsart Art Works, art gallery in Robsart, Saskatchewan
Robsart Hospital, a former rural hospital in Robsart, Saskatchewan
Robsart, New Mexico, a ghost town in Lincoln County, New Mexico.
Robsart Tank, a reservoir which gets its name from the nearby unincorporated area, Robsart, New Mexico.

People
Amy Robsart, also known as Lady Amy Dudley, wife of Lord Robert Dudley